antiVirus is an Armenian online show on YouTube, first aired on June 8, 2012. It is the first video blog in Armenia. It criticizes the negative phenomenons and the behavior of certain groups of the Armenian society they consider bad. Their goal is to "show the society what is the problem and how it can be solved". The show is hosted by Gor Hakobyan, directed by Hayk Barseghyan and promoted by Vahagn Tadevosyan, all three young man from Gyumri, Armenia's second largest city known for its humor.

The show has no traditional days of release. Every episode is uploaded to YouTube on random basis. It is also promoted in blognews.am and asekose.am, which are one of the most visited Armenian websites. As of December 16, 2012, their YouTube videos have a total of 1,181,790 views, unprecedented figure for a show in Armenia, a country of 3 million.

Soon this show aired on Kentron TV.

Episodes

2012 episodes

2013 episodes

Songs
 GOR feat Sencho R.L.-Hip hop
 GOR - "antiBiotik pro"
 GOR - tonatsar jan tonatsar
 HAMO B.I.G. feat GOR - "verjers"
 GOR - Selfie

References

Armenian television series
Armenian-language television shows
2012 web series debuts
2010s Armenian television series
2012 Armenian television series debuts